Captain The Honourable Dudley Worsley Anderson-Pelham (20 April 1812 – 13 April 1851), was a British naval commander and Whig politician.

Background
Anderson-Pelham was a younger son of Charles Anderson-Pelham, 1st Earl of Yarborough, by his wife Henrietta Anne Maria Charlotte, daughter of the Honourable John Simpson and Henrietta Worsley. Charles Anderson-Pelham, 2nd Earl of Yarborough, was his elder brother.

Career
Anderson-Pelham was a captain in the Royal Navy. He was returned to parliament as one of two representatives for Boston at a by-election in 1849,
a seat he held until his early death in April 1851, aged 38.

Family
Anderson-Pelham married Madalina, second daughter of Admiral Sir John Gordon Sinclair of Murkle, 8th Baronet, and sister and co-heiress of Sir Robert Charles Sinclair of Murkle, 9th Baronet, in 1839.

See also

References

External links 

1812 births
1851 deaths
Younger sons of earls
Royal Navy officers
UK MPs 1847–1852
Members of the Parliament of the United Kingdom for English constituencies
Whig (British political party) MPs